Longden End Brook is a watercourse in Greater Manchester. It rises near Windy Hill, and flows down Rakewood Valley and underneath the M62 motorway at Rakewood Viaduct, before arriving at Hollingworth Lake, where it is the main feeder stream.

Tributaries
Lower Whiteley Dean Brook
Castle Shore Brook
Moss Slack Brook
White Isles Brook

Rivers of the Metropolitan Borough of Rochdale
Rivers of Greater Manchester
Littleborough, Greater Manchester
3